The team jumping at the 1928 Summer Olympics took place at Amsterdam. Scores from the individual competition were summed to give results in the team competition.

Results
Source: Official results; De Wael

References

Equestrian at the 1928 Summer Olympics